DiOC6 (3,3′-dihexyloxacarbocyanine iodide) is a fluorescent dye used for the staining of a cell's endoplasmic reticulum, vesicle membranes and mitochondria. Binding to these structures occurs via the dye's hydrophilic groups. DiOC6 can be used to label living cells, however they are quickly damaged due to the dye's extreme phototoxicity, so cells stained with this dye can only be exposed to light for short periods of time. When exposed to blue light, the dye fluoresces green.

See also
 DiI

References

Cyanine dyes
Vital stains
Benzoxazoles
Quaternary ammonium compounds